Three-time defending champion Dylan Alcott defeated David Wagner in the final, 7–6(7–1), 6–1 to win the quad singles wheelchair tennis title at the 2018 Australian Open.

Seeds

Draw

Final

Round robin

References 

General

 Drawsheets on ausopen.com

Specific

Wheelchair Quad Singles
2018 Quad Singles